The sandbar shark (Carcharhinus plumbeus), also known as the brown shark or thickskin shark, is a species of requiem shark, and part of the family Carcharhinidae, native to the Atlantic Ocean and the Indo-Pacific. It is distinguishable by its very high first dorsal fin and interdorsal ridge. It is not to be confused with the similarly named sand tiger shark, or Carcharias taurus.

Description

The sandbar shark is one of the biggest coastal sharks in the world, and is closely related to the dusky shark, the bignose shark, and the bull shark. Its dorsal fin is triangular and very high, and it has very long pectoral fins. Sandbar sharks usually have heavy-set bodies and rounded snouts that are shorter than the average shark's snout. Its upper teeth have broadly uneven cusps with sharp edges. Its second dorsal fin and anal fin are close to the same height. Females reach sexual maturity around the age of 13 with an average fork-length (tip of the nose to fork in the tail) of 154.9 cm, while males tend to reach maturity around age 12 with an average fork-length of 151.6 cm. Its body color can vary from a bluish to a brownish grey to a bronze, with a white or pale underside. Sandbar sharks swim alone or gather in sex-segregated schools that vary in size.

Distribution, habitat, and predation
The sandbar shark, true to its nickname, is commonly found over muddy or sandy bottoms in shallow coastal waters such as bays, estuaries, harbors, or the mouths of rivers, but it also swims in deeper waters (200 m or more) as well as intertidal zones. Sandbar sharks are found in tropical to temperate waters worldwide; in the western Atlantic they range from Massachusetts to Brazil. Juveniles are common to abundant in the lower Chesapeake Bay, and nursery grounds are found from Delaware Bay to South Carolina. Other nursery grounds include Boncuk Bay in Marmaris, Muğla/Turkey and the Florida Keys. Natural predators of the sandbar shark include the tiger shark, and rarely great white sharks. The sandbar shark itself preys on fish, rays, crabs, and molluscs.

Reproduction
Sandbar sharks are viviparous. The embryos are supported in placental yolk sac inside the mother. Females have been found to exhibit both biennial and triennial reproductive cycles, ovulate in early summer, and give birth to an average of eight pups, which they carry for 1 year before giving birth. The longevity of the sandbar shark is typically 35–41 years.

Interactions with humans

Fishing restrictions
Sandbar sharks have been disproportionately targeted by the U.S. commercial shark fisheries in recent decades due to their high fin-to-body weight ratio, and U.S. fishing regulation requiring carcasses to be landed along with shark fins. In 2008, the National Marine Fisheries Service banned all commercial landings of sandbar sharks based on a 2006 stock assessment by SEDAR, and sandbar sharks were listed as vulnerable, due to overfishing. Currently, a small number of specially permitted vessels fish for sandbar sharks for the purpose of scientific research. All vessels in the research fishery are required to carry an independent researcher while targeting sandbars.

Danger to people
In spite of their large size and similar appearance to other dangerous sharks such as bull sharks, sandbar sharks are not considered to be dangerous to people. Very few, if any attacks are attributed to sandbar sharks. As a result, they are considered one of the safest sharks to swim with and are popular sharks for aquaria. However, on August 2, 2021, a 12-year-old girl was bitten on her leg by a sandbar shark in Ocean City, Maryland, USA. This was confirmed by Ocean City authorities on August 5, 2021. The victim required 42 stitches.

Immune system studies 
Immune system genes, specifically MHC genes, are under study to understand the adaptive immune system in sharks such as the sandbar. Sandbars contain MHC class I, MHC class IIα, and class IIβ genes. Shark MHC genes are known to be similar to tetrapod rather than fish. Similarities include the lack of cysteines in class IIα1 domains in tetrapods and carcharhinids. Also, there are a fewer number of classical loci in sharks and tetrapods, when compared to other animals.

Conservation status 
The New Zealand Department of Conservation has classified the sandbar shark as "Data Deficient" under the New Zealand Threat Classification System.

See also

 List of sharks

References

Carcharhinus
Fish of the Atlantic Ocean
Viviparous fish
Fish of Hawaii
Fish of Israel
Fish of the Dominican Republic
Fish described in 1827